Satoshi Inoue may refer to:

, Japanese jazz guitarist
, Japanese politician
Satoshi Inoue (comedian)